Elvis Onyema Ogude (born 21 September 1986, in Abeokuta) is a Nigerian footballer, who plays as a winger or striker.

Teams
2005–2007: Ejido B
2007: AC Bellinzona
2007–2008: Granada 74 CF
2008–2009: AD Ceuta
2009–2010: FC Barcelona B
2010: Recreativo de Huelva B
2011: CD Leganés
2011–2012: Racing Club de Ferrol
2012–present: Dinamo Bucharest

References

External links
 

1986 births
Living people
Nigerian footballers
Nigerian expatriates in Spain
Expatriate footballers in Spain
Polideportivo Ejido footballers
Granada 74 CF footballers
AD Ceuta footballers
FC Barcelona Atlètic players
Atlético Onubense players
Sportspeople from Abeokuta
NEPA Lagos players
Association football forwards
21st-century Nigerian people